The 2019 AFC Beach Soccer Championship was the ninth edition of the AFC Beach Soccer Championship (second official edition), the premier beach soccer tournament contested by Asian men's national teams, organised by the Asian Football Confederation (AFC).

The tournament took place in Pattaya, Thailand between 7–17 March 2019. The championship also acts as the qualification tournament for Asian teams to the 2019 FIFA Beach Soccer World Cup in Paraguay; the top three teams qualify.

Iran were the defending champions but failed to defend the title after losing Japan in the quarter-final. Japan becomes the champion after beating UAE in final, becoming the first team to win the tournament three times.

Teams
A total of 15 teams entered the tournament.

Draw
The draw of the tournament was held on 3 December 2018 in Pattaya, Thailand. The 15 teams were drawn into three groups of four teams and one group of three teams. The teams were seeded according to their performance in the 2017 AFC Beach Soccer Championship final tournament, with the hosts Thailand automatically seeded and assigned to Position A1 in the draw.

Squads

Each team must register a squad of 12 players, minimum two of whom must be goalkeepers (Regulations Articles 26.1 and 26.2).

Group stage
Each team earns three points for a win in regulation time, two points for a win in extra time, one point for a win in a penalty shoot-out, and no points for a defeat. The top two teams of each group advanced to the quarter-finals.

Tiebreakers
Teams are ranked according to points, and if tied on points, the following tiebreaking criteria are applied, in the order given, to determine the rankings (Regulations Article 10.5):
Points in head-to-head matches among tied teams;
Goal difference in head-to-head matches among tied teams;
Goals scored in head-to-head matches among tied teams;
If more than two teams are tied, and after applying all head-to-head criteria above, a subset of teams are still tied, all head-to-head criteria above are reapplied exclusively to this subset of teams;
Goal difference in all group matches;
Goals scored in all group matches;
Penalty shoot-out if only two teams are tied and they met in the last round of the group;
Disciplinary points (yellow card = 1 point, red card as a result of two yellow cards = 3 points, direct red card = 3 points, yellow card followed by direct red card = 4 points);
Drawing of lots.

All times are local, ICT (UTC+7).

Group A

Group B

Group C

Group D

Knockout stage
In the knockout stage, extra time and penalty shoot-out were used to decide the winner if necessary, except for the third place match where penalty shoot-out (no extra time) was used to decide the winner if necessary (Regulations Articles 14.1 and 15.1).

Bracket

Quarter-finals

Semi-finals
Winners qualify for 2019 FIFA Beach Soccer World Cup.

Third place match
Winner qualifies for 2019 FIFA Beach Soccer World Cup.

Final

Winners

Awards
The following awards were given at the conclusion of the tournament:

Goalscorers

Qualified teams for FIFA Beach Soccer World Cup
The following three teams from AFC qualify for the 2019 FIFA Beach Soccer World Cup.

1 Bold indicates champions for that year. Italic indicates hosts for that year.

References

External links
, the-AFC.com
AFC Beach Soccer Championship 2019, stats.the-AFC.com
AFC Beach Soccer Championship Thailand 2019 , at Beach Soccer Worldwide
2019 Asian Cup, at Beach Soccer Russia (in Russian)
Technical Report and Statistics, the AFC

Beach Soccer Championship
Beach Soccer Championship
2019 FIFA Beach Soccer World Cup qualification
International association football competitions hosted by Thailand
2019
2019 in beach soccer
March 2019 sports events in Thailand